Autogas or LPG is liquefied petroleum gas (LPG) used as a fuel in internal combustion engines in vehicles as well as in stationary applications such as generators. It is a mixture of propane and butane.

Autogas is widely used as a "green" fuel, as its use reduces  exhaust emissions by around 15% compared to petrol. One litre of petrol produces 2.3 kg of  when burnt, whereas the equivalent amount of autogas (1.33 litres due to the lower density of autogas) produces only 2 kg of  when burnt. It has an octane rating (MON/RON) that is between 90 and 110 and an energy content (higher heating value—HHV) that is between 25.5 megajoules per litre (for pure propane) and 28.7 megajoules per litre (for pure butane) depending upon the actual fuel composition.

Autogas is the third most popular automotive fuel in the world, with approximately 16 million of 600 million passenger cars powered using the fuel, representing less than 3% of the total market share. Approximately half of all autogas-fueled passenger vehicles are in the five largest markets (in descending order): Turkey, South Korea, Poland, Italy, and Australia.

Terminology variations and confusion
In countries where petroleum spirits is called petrol rather than gasoline, it is common for autogas to be simply referred to as gas. This can be confusing for people from countries where petrol is called gasoline, as they often use gas as an abbreviation of gasoline.

In the United States, autogas is more commonly known under the name of its primary constituent, propane. In 2010 the Propane Education and Research Council adopted the term "Propane Autogas" to refer to LPG used in on-road motor vehicles.

In the UK the terms LPG and autogas are used interchangeably. In Australia and the Netherlands, the common term is LPG. In Spain the term GLP (gas licuado del petróleo) is used.

In Asian countries, particularly those with historical American influences, such as the Philippines, the term autogas is not commonly recognised as a generic term, and the use of the terms LPG or autoLPG is more widely used by consumers, especially by taxi drivers, many of whom use converted vehicles. The converted vehicles are commonly called LPG vehicles or LPG cars.

Difficulties with LPG as automotive fuel 

Despite LPG being widely used as a fuel for cars, motorists in need of autogas can sometimes face difficulties, especially in remote areas and in places where supply and demand are low. Therefore, they may need to plan their journeys around access to stations where LPG can reliably be obtained. Some autogas fuel-systems handle this with parallel autogas and petrol mechanisms in vehicles – allowing either autogas or petrol to be used at any given time.

History 

Internal combustion engines fuelled by gases date from at least 1823 with the work of Samuel Brown in London. By 1935 Hanover had an autogas station,
and a trial run took place with trucks travelling between Moscow and Leningrad in the same year. Initial use depended largely on the types of different/alternative fuels available and on their cost. More widespread application of autogas in transport systems came in the 1970s, especially for taxis (notably in the Netherlands, Italy, Bangkok and Istanbul)
and buses.

Vehicle manufacturers
Toyota made a number of LPG-only engines in their 1970s M, R, and Y engine families.

 Holden Special Vehicles (HSV) also offer bi-fuel models; however, the vehicles use a different system from that of their donor vehicles from Holden, with HSV using technology from Orbital Autogas Systems, which injects the autogas into the engine as a liquid instead of a gas for increased efficiency. Since 2011, Holden's Commodore range (sedan, wagon and ute) has been offered as a dedicated LPG vehicle, with an aluminium fuel tank in place of the petrol tank.

Petrol engined cars, trucks and buses which have not been fitted with LPG/autogas systems by the manufacturers can usually accept third party systems to enable them to use either LPG or petrol. ROUSH CleanTech manufactures designs, engineers, manufactures and installs propane autogas fuel systems for medium-duty Ford commercial vehicles and Type A and Type C Blue Bird school buses.

Vialle manufacture OEM LPG powered scooters and LPG powered mopeds that run equally well on LPG. Ford Australia have offered an LPG-only variant of their Falcon model since 2000.

Countries

Autogas enjoys great popularity in numerous countries and territories, including: Australia, the European Union, Hong Kong, India, the Philippines, Northern Macedonia, South Korea, Serbia, Sri Lanka and Turkey. It is also available at larger petrol stations in several countries. In Armenia, for example, the transport ministry estimates as many as 20 to 30% of vehicles use autogas, because it offers a very cheap alternative to both diesel and petrol, being less than half the price of petrol and some 40% cheaper than diesel. The recent rises in oil-derived fuel prices has significantly increased the difference.

Algeria
Since the 1980s, the Algerian government has pursued a policy to promote the use of autogas in Algeria. The two main incentives for the government to put this policy into action were to take advantage of the large LPG production and to reduce urban pollution. At the end of 2019, there were approximately 500,000 autogas-powered vehicles on the roads, supported by over 1000 refuelling stations.

The Algerian government fixes the prices of all automotive fuels. Autogas is priced in Algeria at 61% of the price of diesel, making it an affordable option.

Australia
LPG was popular in Australia, because it was less than half the price of petrol in urban areas (approx -0.75 per litre, as opposed to -1.35 per litre for unleaded fuel and -1.30 per litre for diesel, in February 2010), and it is locally produced.

The popularity of automotive LPG is declining, as more motorists purchase hybrid-electric cars. local car manufacturing that offered LPG as a factory option ceased, and a federal government excise on LPG commenced in 2011 making the fuel more expensive.

The two major local manufacturers, (Ford and Holden), when they used to manufacture cars in Australia (production ceasing in 2016 and 2017 respectively), used to offer factory fitted autogas in some models of their locally made large cars and commercial vehicles. Mitsubishi Australia formerly manufactured factory-fitted autogas vehicles locally but ceased manufacturing in 2008. All factory autogas vehicles, with the exception of the E-Gas Ford Falcon model, were bi-fuel vehicles, meaning they have the capability to run on either petrol, autogas, or a combination.

Holden Special Vehicles offered a different autogas system from its parent, Holden, that injects the autogas into the engine as a liquid, allowing for higher efficiency.

All Ford LPG vehicles that were locally made used liquid injected LPG and developed 3 kW more than the petrol equivalent.

There are approximately 310,000 autogas-powered cars on Australia's roads. The number of LPG/Dual fuel vehicles continues to decrease, falling by 34.2% (161,191) between 2013 and 2018. Over the same period, the number of registered electric vehicles increased by 159.2% to 8,334.

There has been a corresponding reduction in the number of LPG refuelling locations – less than 2,900 in 2018, down from 3,500 several years prior.

Whilst historically autogas was excise-free, it began being imposed on all vehicle fuels that were not previously subject to excise in 2011 and was added incrementally up to 2015. The excise on autogas started at 2.5 cents per litre in 2011 and reached 12.5 cents per litre in 2015. By comparison, the excise on petrol remained at its existing 38 cents per litre. The subsidy does not apply to business vehicles or vehicles with a gross vehicle mass of over 3,500 kilograms. In addition to the subsidy provided by the Australian federal government, the Western Australian government also provides a  subsidy under the long-running LPG subsidy scheme.

Belgium
The use of autogas (called LPG in both French and Dutch speaking Belgium) was once very popular in Belgium, thanks to the subsidies given by the government to install conversion kits. Since, 2003, when the subsidies disappeared, the number of cars running on LPG has decreased and the number of cars running on diesel has increased. This was partly due to the tax incentives to purchase diesel cars. In recent years, the use of autogas as a vehicle fuel has accounted for less than 2% of vehicle fuel use in Belgium. At the end of 2003, there was an estimate of 93,000 autogas-powered vehicles on Belgium, supported by 600 refuelling stations. In 2010 there were 33,482 cars equipped with LPG and in 2012 it went down to 22,265. Since 2012 there has been a slight increase in the number of autogas-powered vehicles of around 14%. This increase is mainly due to the phasing-out of the tax incentives to buy diesel cars. The number of refuelling stations equipped with LPG has increased and in 2012 there were 727 stations.

In Belgium, autogas is totally free of excises, but not of VAT. , the price of a litre of autogas is around a third of the price of a litre of diesel, making it the cheapest car fuel available in Belgium. This is a strong incentive for cross-border LPG refuelling traffic with neighbouring countries, especially with France, where LPG is much more expensive.

To compensate for the loss of tax revenue, Belgian cars equipped with LPG pay a higher road tax than petrol or compressed natural gas (CNG) cars. In a Government's effort to incentivate the use of LPG cars, the registration tax paid by LPG cars is lower than the registration tax of CNG, petrol and diesel cars because. Thus since 2013, brand-new LPG cars (and LPG cars with less than one year of age) benefit from an important reduction in registration duty.

Despite the fact that autogas is excise free in Belgium, it is the cheapest car fuel in Belgium and that it enjoys an important reduction in registration duty, autogas has never reached again the levels of use that it once had in the 1990s. Belgium does not provide with subsidies for LPG or CNG car installations. The current subsidies provided to CNG car installations since 2014 are provided by the natural gas private industry.

Since 2013, OPEL is the only distributor that still sells brand-new factory-installed LPG cars in Belgium.

Bulgaria
Autogas consumption in Bulgaria accounted for 14% the total fuel consumption in 2003, an amount which has tripled since 1999. By the end of 2003, there were an estimated 195,000 autogas-powered vehicles on the road, with around 1,500 refuelling stations. Autogas is also very popular with commercial users in Bulgaria, as 90% of minibuses and taxicabs were able to run on the fuel. Vehicles originally manufactured to operate on autogas are virtually non-existent in Bulgaria, so the vast majority of the vehicles are third-party conversions.

Canada

Autogas, or auto propane as it is more commonly referred to in Canada, is the most popular alternative fuel in the country. It is primarily used by high consumption public and private fleets (taxis, couriers, school buses and transit vehicles).

Canadian auto propane demand began to increase dramatically in the 1980s after the Government of Canada introduced a  grant in 1981 for consumers to convert their vehicles to run on propane in response to national energy security concerns. Some provinces also offered various grants and incentives for propane conversions. Vehicle conversions reached approximately 200,000 in the early 1990s, and auto propane was estimated to be available at over 5,000 locations.  The Federal Government grant was discontinued in 1985. Auto propane demand began to decline in the early 1990s due to changes in technology and relatively low cost of gasoline and diesel fuel.

An increase in demand has occurred since 2010, as a result of lower prices relative to gasoline and diesel fuel and improved technology. In 2014, it is estimated that the number of auto propane vehicles on the road in Canada is between 25,000 – 50,000 and the number of fuelling stations is 2,000. In 2014, auto propane amounted to 7% of the total domestic propane consumption in Canada.

Auto propane is desirable for fleets due to the fact that in many cities in Canada it costs about 40% less than gasoline and diesel. Auto propane also enjoys favourable fuel tax status and is exempt from the federal excise tax and is taxed at a lower rate than gasoline and diesel in every province and territory. Average auto propane prices are reported by Natural Resources Canada.

The only OEM vehicle available for purchase in Canada is the Blue Bird Corporation Propane-Powered Vision.  Others are pending.  Aftermarket conversions represent the balance of the market. These conversions are typically performed on gasoline vehicles and may be either mono fuel (propane only) or dual fuel (operate on propane or gasoline). These conversions are performed in accordance to provincial and territorial regulations and the Canadian Standards Association (CSA) B149.5 – Installation code for propane fuel systems and tanks on highway vehicles.
Another propane option gaining some popularity is diesel blend where propane is blended into the diesel fuel as it is injected into the combustion chamber. This reduces diesel consumption and improves emissions.

Converting a vehicle to propane is approximately half the cost of converting a vehicle to natural gas in Canada. In just about every case, a propane dispensing facility will cost significantly less money than any other fuel, including gasoline or diesel. Installing a propane fuelling station will typically cost up to 95% less than a natural gas fuelling station.

China

Autogas consumption in China has grown rapidly since the 1990s, has slowed down in the early 2000s, but has started to grow again in recent years. In 2009, autogas refuelling stations have spread to 25 cities and has become a major alternative fuel in China. Motorcycles account for a large portion of the autogas, with over 260,000 autogas motorcycles in Shanghai alone. In Shenyang, the local government is encouraging public transport to convert to autogas, and as of 2009 over 160,000 taxicabs run on the fuel as well as over 2,500 buses. The city of Guangzhou accounted for 46.56% of national autogas consumption in 2009. Only 24% of China's Liquefied Petroleum Gas is produced domestically.

Croatia
As of 2008, approximately 30,000 Croatians drove using autogas, which at the time was available from 90 stations throughout the nation. In 2009, it was estimated that there were 60,000 autogas-powered cars on Croatia's roads, and in 2010, it is estimated that 150,000 drivers in Croatia were using autogas. This recent increase in popularity has largely been attributed to the lower price of autogas compared to petrol or diesel.

In 2009, Croatia exported 51% of domestically produced liquefied petroleum gas (LPG), leaving only 49% for consumption. Out of that 49%, 45% of domestically sold LPG is used as autogas. Damir Stambuk from the Croatian Ministry of Economy, which is also responsible for energy, said that Croatia is not yet ready for a regular autogas market due to a small network of stations, but in the future it will be.

Czech Republic
At the end of 2003, the roads of the Czech Republic had an estimated 145,000 autogas vehicles with 350 refuelling stations.

Denmark
Autogas has become uncommon in Denmark since taxes have risen, making LPG more expensive than unleaded petrol. As a result, there is no customer demand, leaving only around 13 refuelling stations. The stations are run by Shell, YX, OK, Uno-X, Q8 and Statoil.

France
It was estimated that France would have over 62,500 autogas vehicles on the road by the end of 2010. By the end of 2003, there were an estimated 190,000 autogas vehicles in use with almost 1,900 refuelling stations. In 2005, autogas accounted for around 0.4% of the total automotive fuel use.

Germany

In Germany, the fuel is called Autogas as well (CNG is known as Erdgas). There were 6,700 fuel stations selling autogas in 2014, supplying about 500,000 registered gas-fuelled cars (1.1 percent of all cars in Germany). mylpg.eu lists 7.240 stations in 2016. In addition to filling stations, numerous suppliers of industrial gas run dedicated autogas stations on their premises. Most filling pumps use the ACME adapter but DISH can also be found.

Greece
LPG or autogas, despite having existed for about three decades in Greece (initially used only in taxis, in 1999 it was legalized for all vehicles), has become popular in the last three to five years, mostly due to the increase in petrol prices. The number of refuelling points as well as conversion workshops is rapidly increasing. Currently (2012) there are about 404 filling stations. Some companies (e.g., Fiat, Toyota, Subaru, Opel, Chevrolet) offer some models with bi-fuel capability. The price at the end of 2012 was about 55% of the price of petrol. The most common term used for it is ygraerio, meaning "liquid gas".

Hong Kong
In Hong Kong, all taxicabs bar electric taxis rely on autogas. Many public light buses also rely on autogas.

Ireland
Autogas was very popular in Ireland during the early 1980s, and the country had a large and extensive network of refuelling points. It proved popular at the time particularly as Ireland was in a deep recession for much of the 1980s. However autogas fell out of favor in the late 1990s and 2000s due to unreliable early autogas systems and as the country experienced massive economic growth and unprecedented wealth demand for conversions and autogas subsequently dwindled.

However, as Ireland once again entered economic recession, austerity measures and increased fuel taxation saw the price of traditional Diesel and petrol fuels skyrocket to record highs. This has seen a small revival of autogas in Ireland in 2012 with new conversion outlets and refueling points opening again. It has been re-introduced to Ireland by the new Polish diaspora living in the country drawing upon their knowledge and expertise from Europe's biggest autogas market.

There is a much larger market for Autogas in Northern Ireland, due to UK Government supports. There are currently 86 LPG outlets on the island of Ireland with 45 in Northern Ireland and 41 in the Republic of Ireland.

Italy
Autogas is very popular in Italy. With over 1,000,000 autogas vehicles on the road, it is the second largest autogas market in the European Union, after Poland. Italy was one of the first countries in the world to introduce autogas, which happened in the 1950s. In the first half of 2010 alone, more than 170,000 new autogas cars were registered. General Motors has been especially successful in Italy, with two-thirds of the vehicles sold in 2008 being autogas-capable.
Self fill is not permitted in Italy.

Japan

As of 2013, Japan has about 280,000 autogas vehicles on the road, which is less than in recent years.  However, the number of autogas vehicles on Japan's roads has been very unstable. The first autogas taxicabs were introduced in Japan in the 1960s and 1970s. With a sharp decline in the 1990s, the number started to rise again in 2003. Between 2004 and 2010, the number dropped. The vast majority of autogas vehicles on Japanese roads are taxicabs or commercial vehicles. This is why, in 2010, the Japan LP Gas Association started an initiative to encourage corporations and motorists alike to switch to autogas vehicles. The initiative involves 27,000 Japanese retailers to introduce an autogas vehicle into their fleet every three years. Many of these corporations already have autogas vehicles, but Makoto Arahata from the Japanese LP Gas Association says that there is still much room for improvement.

Lithuania
Lithuania is one of the countries with the highest rates of autogas use in Europe. Autogas is very popular in Lithuania and it is widely available. The distribution of most car brands are in the hands of the Polish distributors, therefore factory-installed LPG in brand-new cars are as common and widely available as they are in Poland.

Malta
Autogas was introduced to Malta on 22 May 2012 by Liquigas. The first filling station is located at the Malta International Airport.

Netherlands

Use of autogas has varied in the Netherlands. It went up in the 1980s and has decreased ever since, except for an increase in 2005. In 2010, there are around 220,000 autogas vehicles on the road (total cars being a little less than 8 million).

Autogas is sold at most fuel stations, stations in urban areas may not supply it due to safety regulations with regard to LPG storage tanks. The 'Dutch Bayonet' is the standard filling device used.

The road tax on autogas vehicles can be up to 2 times that of petrol powered vehicles. On the modern third generation (G3) autogas systems, the difference on tax is zero for cars up to 850 kg, but increases for heavier cars. The diesel tax is twice the petrol tax. Because the price of autogas is less than half that of petrol, fitting a car with an LPG system is only economically feasible at more than around 10,000 km/year.

New Zealand

LPG has modest popularity in New Zealand among road users, and reached its peak during the period immediately following the oil crises of the 1970s. As part of his Think Big policies to encourage energy self-sufficiency, Rob Muldoon heavily subsidised the construction of LPG infrastructure during the late 1970s and early 1980s.

Pakistan
LPG was allowed to be used as an automotive fuel in 2005 and first Autogas station became operative in 2010 located at Sialkot.
Up until 2014 there were only four Autogas stations operating in Pakistan serving around 1000 vehicles. LPG failed to attract attention of the investors and customers due to extremely cheap prices of CNG as Pakistan had huge Natural Gas reserves. Pakistan in a decade became the largest consumer of CNG. This impacted Pakistan's reserves in a negative way and they receded in a quick span. In November 2013 Oil and Gas Regulatory Authority issued about 40 NoC's for setting up LPG Autogas stations mainly to PSO, a State owned Petroleum giant. However, in December 2013 Oil and Gas Regulatory Authority (OGRA) contrary to the rest of the world where LPG is promoted, declared LPG a risk to public safety thus banned LPG to be used in Public transport vehicles, thus closing the era of LPG in Pakistan even before it started.

Poland

Poland has one of the oldest and most successful autogas markets in Europe. It is the country with the highest rate of LPG use per capita, higher even than Italy. In 2011, there were 6050 autogas refuelling stations and 2,500,000 autogas vehicles on the road. The number of autogas vehicles in Poland increased by 8% in 2011, however autogas sales decreased by 3.7%. This is mostly due to older vehicles being replaced with newer, more fuel efficient ones. Almost half of Poland's LPG comes from Russia. Most of the Polish distributors offer brand-new factory installed LPG cars of mostly all brands.

Russian Federation
 

Autogas is widely used in Russia. In its modern form it has been used since the 1970s, when high oil prices and difficulties in economically producing lightweight diesel engines motivated the CPSU to try autogas in light trucks and buses with carburettor engines. There are two types of autogas equipment and autogas stations as well: LPG (propane-butane mix) and compressed natural gas (CNG, methane). Natural gas is stored at a higher pressure than LPG (200 bar vs. 10 bar for LPG).

The main consumer of LPG is commercial light-weight cargo transport (so as GAZelles in Russia are mostly LPG-powered). There are some community supported sources where people post gas station locations on the map. These sources may be used by some travelers going to Russia by car. First limited series of vehicles driven by multi-fuel including methane has appeared in the middle of the 20th century.

, the number of autogas vehicles in Russia is actively growing. Some are built in the factory to use autogas and some are retrofitted existing vehicles.
There are a number of incentives also provided for owners to convert their cars to use autogas. There is also a huge disparity in the rate of development of methane and propane gas stations. But gasification of new cars as already mentioned in the article is possible directly from the factory or by official dealers of car brands.

CNG is more commonly used for commercial passenger transport (taxis, city buses). Although the Russian government subsidizes conversion of petrol-powered vehicles to CNG by reimbursement of the majority of its price (CNG equipment costs twice more as LPG), it is not popular among private car owners because CNG tanks are much larger than LPG tanks and CNG stations are not common (LPG stations are as common as petrol and diesel stations).

Serbia
Serbia has a well-developed autogas market. Many petrol-powered vehicles from the 1980s, 1990s and early 2000s, both locally made cars such as Yugos and imports from Western Europe, have been converted to LPG. Autogas systems used in Serbia are mostly from Italian companies like Lovato and Tartarini. As of August 2014, LPG is approximately 40% cheaper per litre than petrol. It is available at petrol stations in the cities and along major routes, as well as some dedicated stations.

South Korea 
South Korea had the world's largest Autogas market, which peaked in 2010. As of 2021, the country has a fleet of 1.96 million registered autogas-powered cars, with 1,992 refueling stations. A large portion of the autogas fleet is light-duty vehicles used for commercial ends, such as taxis and rental cars.

Spain

Autogas (called GLP in Spain) was restricted by law to taxis and public transport buses for many decades. In recent years the market has been liberalised and autogas has been made available to all kinds of vehicles. The Spanish government subsidises the installations of autogas in cars and the purchase of brand-new factory-installed autogas cars. There are many factory-installed autogas brand-new cars available for purchase. While the number of autogas-powered cars is increasing every year, it is still low. The main barrier for a major expansion of the number of autogas-powered cars is that the number of refuelling stations for autogas is also still low, but it is increasing quickly too. By the end of 2015 there were 342 stations selling autogas in Spain. Spain is currently the only country using the new EU-wide common standard connector for autogas, the Euroconnector or Euronozzle adapter. The Euronozzle adapter was supposed to replace the current three different LPG filling systems (ACME, Bajonet and Dish) in Europe, but that would be expensive, so investments in such a change-over have not started yet. Before Euronozzle, Spain used a form of Bajonet. Spain's neighbouring countries France and Portugal continue to use Dish adapters for filling vehicles up with LPG.

Thailand
Thailand has for over 15 years run LPG taxi cabs in Bangkok, though autos and buses had erroneously labelled NGV stickers when in fact, they were LPG. By 2008, half of all taxicabs had switched from gasoline to LPG by low cost local modification. Despite a government push, the number of LPG vehicles continues to grow and outpace NGVs. The number of autogas vehicles has continues to see high growth, despite a push for operators to switch to NGV (CNG), there has been considerable resistance due to inherent costs. As of January 2013, Thailand has 1,014,000 LPG fueled vehicles, and consumed 606,000 tonnes in 2012 of LPG, while 483 stations serve some 380,000 CNG vehicles.

Turkey

Turkey has the highest percentage of autogas vehicles in the world. Some 37% of passenger cars run on autogas, and autogas consumption now exceeds petrol consumption. The Turkish government regulated the autogas price to provide consumers with a net economic advantage of 20–35%. As of the end of 2010, there are 8,500 autogas fueling stations around the country and market growth has been supported by a network of 1,000 licensed conversion shops.

According to the Turkish Statistics Institute's report, the nation had over 16,500,000 vehicles in January 2012. 50.3% are passenger vehicles. 16.2% light weight trucks, 15.7% motorcycles, 9.2% tractors, 4.6% heavy weight trucks, 2.5%  mini buses for transportation, 1.4% buses and 0.1% special purpose vehicles.

Currently, average 50,000 new generation cars are sold per month.

LPG is dominantly used in Turkey as an autogas while there are only around 500 CNG fuelled cars and there are only two CNG filling stations.

In Turkey, Diesel vehicles are usually not converted to LPG because of unsuccessful applications in the past. For that reason, installations are often not made to light and heavy weight trucks, tractors, bus and mini-buses and motorcycles, because the owners of conversion workshops are fearful of the risks.

8.3 million LPG cars are passenger vehicles. 33% of the passenger cars (2,739,000) are diesel powered and 67% are petrol powered (5,561,000). As there is no conversion to diesel cars, among 5,561,000 petrol powered passenger cars, According to the reports of the MMO, (Chamber of Mechanical Engineers, authorized to check emissions and licenses) there were 3.1 million LPG fuelled vehicles by the end of the year 2011.

This means more than 55% of petrol powered passenger vehicles are already converted to LPG.

The converted vehicles were mostly carburetted engines. Nearly 90% of the old carburetted engines have already been converted and day by day, new generation vehicle owners are also choosing LPG as an alternative fuel.

The reason of this high LPG application is because of the Turkish government's application of high taxes upon petrol and diesel prices, and because of these taxes, Turkey finds itself using the second most expensive petrol in the world (after Norway) even though Turkey has borders with OPEC countries exporting crude oil and petroleum to the world and has the lowest transportation costs. Turkish people found the only solution to save money from their road expenses by converting their cars to autogas which gives them an advantage of 35% to 40% savings.

This big conversion is the success of Turkish autogas kits and autogas tanks manufacturers starting from 1995, even though autogas use became legal in 2000. At the same time, Italian companies also supplied systems through several companies.

Ukraine
Ukraine has a well-developed autogas market. Many petrol-powered vehicles from the 1980s, 1990s and 2000s, both locally made cars such as ZAZ and imports from Western Europe, have been converted to LPG. One may also buy a factory-prepared LPG car. As of August 2017, LPG is approximately 2 times cheaper per litre than petrol. It is widely available at petrol stations in the cities and along major routes, as well as some dedicated stations.

United Kingdom
According to the LPG trade association in the UK there are about 1500 refuelling stations that cater for the 160,000 LPG powered vehicles on UK roads. This represents less than 1% of vehicles.
The only Government incentive to use LPG is the lower road fuel tax applied to LPG compared to petrol. As of January 2012, the saving of about 60 pence per litre is the highest it has ever been and that combined with conversion prices being an historic low should result in an increase in LPG conversions.
Technology has reached the point where almost all conversions are 'Sequential Vapour Injection', and in the UK there is a large number of kits with various price and quality ranges to choose from, resulting in a very competitive market.

United States

Autogas is on the rise in the United States. As of February 2012, the United States has more than 147,000 autogas vehicles on the road, accounting for just 2% of the world's total and as of June 2013, the United States has 2,843 autogas fueling stations, making it easier for drivers to refuel across the country. The U.S. Department of Energy has a website that autogas drivers can easily locate autogas fueling stations near them as well as other alternative fuels. Autogas use by car drivers can help the United States to reduce dependence on foreign oil as 90% of all U.S. Autogas is produced in the U.S.
In 2005, a provision was enacted that placed a 50-cent per gallon tax credit on propane autogas as part of H.R. 4853, making it $1 per gallon cheaper than petrol on average. The alternative fuel credit was extended in 2010 and remained in effect until the end of 2011.

Autogas for America claims to be the unified voice of the autogas industry in the United States. Composed of autogas experts, transportation industry specialists and environmental advocates, Autogas for America says it "leverages industry cooperation to widen recognition of autogas among the US public, media and government."

The Alternative Fuel Association of America based in New York is the largest association of its kind; it give incentives of up to $4,000 to the owners of fleets who retrofit their vehicle to autogas; the Association works closely with CNG and LPG Max of America, one of the pioneer companies in the LPG and CNG conversions in America.

Piston-powered small aircraft that use autogas require a Supplemental Type Certificate issued by the United States Federal Aviation Administration.

System types

The different autogas systems generally use the same type of filler, tanks, lines and fittings but use different components in the engine bay. Liquid injection systems use special tanks with circulation pumps and return lines similar to petrol fuel injection systems.

There are three basic types of autogas system. The oldest of these is the conventional converter-and-mixer system, which has existed since the 1940s and is still widely used today. The other two types are known as injection systems, but there are significant differences between the two.

A converter-mixer system uses a converter to change liquid fuel from the tank into vapour, then feeds that vapour to the mixer where it is mixed with the intake air. This is also known as a venturi system or "single point" system.

Vapour phase injection systems also use a converter, but unlike the mixer system, the gas exits the converter at a regulated pressure. The gas is then injected into the air intake manifold via a series of electrically controlled injectors. The injector opening times are controlled by the autogas control unit. This unit works in much the same way as a petrol fuel injection control unit. This allows much more accurate metering of fuel to the engine than is possible with mixers, improving economy and/or power while reducing emissions.

Liquid phase injection systems do not use a converter, but instead deliver the liquid fuel into a fuel rail in much the same manner as a petrol injection system. These systems are still very much in their infancy. Because the fuel vaporises in the intake, the air around it is cooled significantly. This increases the density of the intake air and can potentially lead to substantial increases in engine power output, to the extent that such systems are usually de-tuned to avoid damaging other parts of the engine. Liquid phase injection has the potential to achieve much better economy and power plus lower emission levels than are possible using mixers or vapour phase injectors.

System components

Filler

The fuel is transferred into a vehicle tank as liquid by connecting the bowser at the filling station to the filler fitting on the vehicle.

The type of filler used varies from country to country, and in some cases different types are used within the same country.

The four types are:
 ACME thread.  This type has a threaded fitting onto which the bowser nozzle is screwed before the trigger is pulled to establish a seal before fuel transfer. This type is used in Australia, US, Germany, Belgium, Republic of Ireland. Some LPG filling stations in the United Kingdom also use ACME.
 'Dutch' bayonet. This type establishes a gas-proof seal by a push and twist action. This type is used in the United Kingdom, Netherlands and Switzerland. Some LPG filling stations in Norway also use bayonet. Spain was using a longer version of bayonet when LPG was still for taxis only, but has switched to Euronozzle when LPG sales were made available to the general public.
 'Italian' dish. This type is used in Italy, France, Portugal, Poland, Czech Republic, Slovakia, Austria, Hungary, Slovenia, Croatia, Serbia, Albania, Greece, Bulgaria, Romania, Ukraine, Russia, Lithuania, Latvia, Estonia and Sweden.
 Euronozzle. This new type of adaptor was developed to minimize or eliminate the small amount of gas that escapes when disconnecting the filler hose from the vehicle. The Euronozzle is (or was) supposed to become a unified new filling system for the entire European continent, but investments in such a change-over have failed to start. As of 2018 Spain remains the only country in Europe that has adopted the Euronozzle adaptor, a decision that was made when Spain had to redevelop a filling station network for LPG from practically zero.

Adaptors that allow a vehicle fitted with a particular system to refuel at a station equipped with another system are available.

The fill valve contains a check valve so that the liquid in the line between the filler and the tank(s) does not escape when the bowser nozzle is disconnected.

In installations where more than one tank is fitted, T-fittings may be used to connect the tanks to one filler so that the tanks are filled simultaneously. In some applications, more than one filler may be fitted, such as on opposite sides of the vehicle. These may be connected to separate tanks, or may be connected to the same tanks using T-fittings in the same manner as for connecting multiple tanks to one filler.

Fillers are typically made of brass to avoid the possibility of sparks when attaching or removing the bowser that might occur if steel fittings were used.

Hoses, pipes and fittings

The hose between the filler and tank(s) is called the fill hose or fill line. The hose or pipe between the tank(s) and the converter is called the service line. These both carry liquid under pressure.

The flexible hose between the converter and mixer is called the vapour hose or vapour line. This line carries vapour at low pressure and has a much larger diameter to suit.

Where the tank valves are located inside an enclosed space such as the boot of a sedan, a plastic containment hose is used to provide a gas-tight seal between the gas components and the inside of the vehicle.

Liquid hoses for LPG are specifically designed and rated for the pressures that exist in LPG systems, and are made from materials designed to be compatible with the fuel. Some hoses are made with crimped fittings, while others are made using re-usable fittings that are pressed or screwed onto the end of the hose.

Rigid sections of liquid line are usually made using copper tubing, although in some applications, steel pipes are used instead. The ends of the pipes are always double-flared and fitted with flare nuts to secure them to the fittings.

Liquid line fittings are mostly made from brass. The fittings typically adapt from a thread in a component, such as a BSP or NPT threaded hole on a tank, to an SAE flare fitting to suit the ends of pipes or hoses.

Tank

Vehicles are often fitted with only one tank, but multiple tanks are used in a some applications. In passenger car applications, the tank is typically either a cylindrical tank, made from steel, mounted in the boot of the vehicle or a toroidal tank (also steel) or set of permanently interconnected cylinders placed in the spare wheel well. In commercial vehicle applications, the tanks are generally cylindrical tanks mounted either in the cargo space or on the chassis underneath the body. Increasingly, the tank is an aluminium Conformable Tank, which is lighter, has more capacity and cannot rust.

The tanks have fittings for filling, liquid outlet, emergency relief of excess pressure, fuel level gauge and sometimes a vapour outlet. These may be separate valves mounted into a series of 3 to 5 holes in a plate welded into the tank shell, or may be assembled onto a multi-valve unit which is bolted into one large hole on a boss welded, or in the case of an aluminium tank, extruded as part of the tank shell.

Modern fill valves are usually fitted with an automatic fill limiter (AFL) to prevent overfilling. The AFL has a float arm which restricts the flow significantly but does not shut it off entirely. This is intended to cause the pressure in the line to rise enough to tell the bowser to stop pumping but not cause dangerously high pressures. Before AFLs were introduced, it was common for the filler (with integral check valve) to be screwed directly into the tank, as the operator had to open an ullage valve at the tank while filling, allowing vapour out of the top of the tank and stopping filling when liquid started coming out of the ullage valve to indicate that the tank was full. Modern tanks are not fitted with ullage valves.

The liquid outlet is usually used to supply fuel to the engine, and is usually referred to as the service valve. Modern service valves incorporate an electric shut-off solenoid. In applications using very small engines such as small generators, vapour may be withdrawn from the top of the tank instead of liquid from the bottom of the tank.

The emergency pressure relief valve in the tank is called a hydrostatic pressure relief valve. It is designed to open if the pressure in the tank is dangerously high, thus releasing some vapour to the atmosphere to reduce the pressure in the tank. The release of a small quantity of vapour reduces the pressure in the tank, which causes some of the liquid in the tank to vaporise to re-establish equilibrium between liquid and vapour. The latent heat of vaporisation causes the tank to cool, which reduces pressure even further.

The gauge sender is usually a magnetically coupled arrangement, with a float arm inside the tank rotating a magnet, which rotates an external gauge. The external gauge is usually readable directly, and most also incorporate an electronic sender to operate a fuel gauge on the dashboard.

Valves
There are a number of types of valve used in autogas systems. The most common ones are shut-off or filter-lock valves, which are used to stop flow in the service line. These may be operated by vacuum or electricity. On bi-fuel systems with a petrol carburettor, a similar shut-off valve is usually fitted in the petrol line between the pump and carburettor.

Check valves are fitted in the filler and on the fill input to the fuel tank to prevent fuel flowing back the wrong way.

Service valves are fitted to the outlet from the tank to the service line. These have a tap to turn the fuel on and off. The tap is usually only closed when the tank is being worked on. In some countries, an electrical shut-off valve is built into the service valve.

Where multiple tanks are fitted, a combination of check valves and a hydrostatic relief valve are usually installed to prevent fuel from flowing from one tank to another. In Australia, there is a common assembly designed for this purpose. It is a combined twin check valve and hydrostatic relief valve assembly built in the form of a T-fitting, such that the lines from the tanks come into the sides of the valve and the outlet to the converter comes out the end. Because there is only one common brand of these valves, they are known colloquially as a Sherwood valve.

Converter
The converter (also known as vaporiser or reducer) is a device designed to change the fuel from a pressurised liquid to a vapour at around atmospheric pressure for delivery to the mixer or vapour phase injectors. Because of the refrigerant characteristic of the fuel, heat must be put into the fuel by the converter. This is usually achieved by having engine coolant circulated through a heat exchanger that transfers heat from that coolant to the LPG.

There are two distinctly different basic types of converter for use with mixer type systems. The European style of converter is a more complex device that incorporates an idle circuit and is designed to be used with a simple fixed venturi mixer. The American style of converter is a simpler design which is intended to be used with a variable venturi mixer that incorporates an idle circuit.

Engines with a low power output such as; scooters, quad bikes and generators can use a simpler type of converter (also known as governor or regulator). These converters are fed with fuel in vapour form.
Evaporation takes place in the tank where refrigeration occurs as the liquid fuel boils. The tanks large surface area exposed to the ambient air temperature combined with the low power output (fuel requirement) of the engine make this type of system viable. The refrigeration of the fuel tank is proportional to fuel demand hence this arrangement is only used on smaller engines.
This type of converter can either be fed with vapour at tank pressure (called a 2-stage regulator) or be fed via a tank mounted regulator at a fixed reduced pressure (called a single stage regulator).

Mixer
The mixer is the device that mixes the fuel into the air flowing to the engine. The mixer incorporates a venturi designed to draw the fuel into the airflow due to the movement of the air.

Mixer type systems have existed since the 1940s and some designs have changed little over that time. Mixers are now being increasingly superseded by injectors.

Vapour phase injectors
Most vapour phase injection systems mount the solenoids in a manifold block or injector rail, then run hoses to the nozzles, which are screwed into holes drilled and tapped into the runners of the intake manifold. There is usually one nozzle for each cylinder. Some vapour injection systems resemble petrol injection, having separate injectors that fit into the manifold or head in the same manner as petrol injectors, and are fed fuel through a fuel rail.

Liquid phase injectors
Liquid phase injectors are mounted onto the engine in a manner similar to petrol injectors, being mounted directly at the inlet manifold and fed liquid fuel from a fuel rail.

Electrical and electronic controls
There are four distinct electrical systems that may be used in autogas systems – fuel gauge sender, fuel shut-off, closed loop feedback mixture control and injection control.

In some installations, the fuel gauge sender fitted to the autogas tank is matched to the original fuel gauge in the vehicle. In others, an additional gauge is added to display the level of fuel in the autogas tank separately from the existing petrol gauge.

In most modern installations, an electronic device called a tachometric relay or safety switch is used to operate electrical shut-off solenoids. These work by sensing that the engine is running by detecting ignition pulses. Some systems use an engine oil pressure sensor instead. In all installations, there is a filterlock (consisting of a filter assembly and a vacuum or electric solenoid operated shut-off valve) located at the input to the converter. In European converters, there is also a solenoid in the converter to shut off the idle circuit. These valves are usually both connected to the output of the tachometric relay or oil pressure switch. Where solenoids are fitted to the outputs of fuel tanks, these are also connected to the output of the tachometric relay or oil pressure switch. In installations with multiple tanks, a switch or changeover relay may be fitted to allow the driver to select which tank to use fuel from. On bi-fuel, the switch used to change between fuels is used to turn off the tachometric relay.

Closed loop feedback systems use an electronic controller that operates in much the same way as in a petrol fuel injection systems, using an oxygen sensor to effectively measure the air/fuel mixture by measuring the oxygen content of the exhaust and control valve on the converter or in the vapour line to adjust the mixture. Mixer type systems that do not have a closed loop feedback fitted are sometimes referred to as open loop systems.

Injection systems use a computerised control system which is very similar to that used in petrol injection systems. In virtually all systems, the injection control system integrates the tachometric relay and closed loop feedback functions.

Optional valve protection

Many LPG equipment installers recommend the installation of so-called valve protection systems. These can consist in the most simple case of a bottle containing valve protection liquid. The liquid is drawn into the air intake system and distributed into the engines' cylinders along with the fuel and air.

More sophisticated systems can consist of a piggyback ECU that is synchronised with the LPG injector ECU. This results in a more precise injection of valve protection fluid.

Converter-and-mixer system operation
The designs of converters and mixers are matched to each other by matching sizes and shapes of components within the two.

In most areas of the world the word "converter" is not commonly used. 'Regulator' or 'reducer' or 'vaporizer' are more popular.

Because it has 3 main functions:
 Reducer: reduces the high pressure of incoming liquid phase LPG down to atmospheric pressure.
 Regulator: regulates the gas flow according to the requirement of the engine.
 Vaporizer: vaporizes the liquid form LPG into gas form by using the hot coolant circulation of the engine.

In European style systems, the size and shape of the venturi of the carburettor is designed to match the converter. In USA style systems, the air valve and metering pins in the mixer are sized to match the diaphragm size and spring stiffness in the converter. In both cases, the components are matched by the manufacturers and only basic adjustments are needed during installation and tuning.

An autogas carburettor may simply consist of a throttlebody and a mixer, sometimes fitted together using an adapter, the venturi is not needed.

Cold start enrichment is achieved by the fact that the engine coolant is cold when the engine is cold. This causes denser vapour to be delivered to the mixer. As the engine warms up, the coolant temperature rises until the engine is at operating temperature and the mixture has leaned off to the normal running mixture. Depending on the system, the throttle may need to be held open further when the engine is cold in the same manner as with a petrol carburettor. On others, the normal mixture is intended to be somewhat lean and no cold-start throttle increase is needed. Because of the way enrichment is achieved, no additional choke butterfly is required for cold starting with LPG. Some evaporators have an electric choke valve, energising this valve, before starting the engine, will spray some LPG vapour into the carburetor to help cold start.

The temperature of the engine is critical to the tuning of an autogas system. The engine thermostat effectively controls the temperature of the converter, thus directly affecting the mixture. A faulty thermostat, or a thermostat of the wrong temperature range for the design of the system may not operate correctly.

The power output capacity of a system is limited by the ability of the converter to deliver a stable flow of vapour. A coolant temperature lower than intended will reduce the maximum power output possible, as will an air bubble trapped in the cooling circuit or complete loss of coolant. All converters have a limit, beyond which mixtures become unstable. Unstable mixtures typically contain tiny droplets of liquid fuel that were not heated enough in the converter and will vaporise in the mixer or intake to form an excessively rich mixture. When this occurs, the mixture will become so rich that the engine will flood and stall. Because the outside of the converter will be at or below 0 °C when this happens, water vapour from the air will freeze onto the outside of the converter, forming an icy white layer. Some converters are very susceptible to cracking when this happens.

LPG injection for diesel vehicles
LPG may be used for a supplemental fuel for diesels of all sizes. Diesel contains 128,700 BTU per US gallon, where propane contains 91,690 BTU per US gallon. If LPG is 30–40% less expensive, there may very well be a saving.  Any actual savings are dependent on the relative cost of diesel versus LPG. In Australia, where diesel costs substantially more than LPG, savings of 10 to 20% are claimed.

The above systems add small quantities of LPG with the primary aim of improving economy, but much larger quantities of LPG can be injected in order to increase power. Even at full output a diesel engine runs about 50% lean of stoichiometric to avoid black smoke production, so there is a substantial amount of oxygen in the intake charge which is not consumed in the combustion process. This oxygen is therefore available for the combustion of a substantial addition of LPG resulting in a large increase in power output.

See also
 Gas engine
 Hybrid vehicle

References

External links

 European LPG Association
 LPG Information
 World LP Gas Association

Engine fuel system technology
Fuel gas
Liquefied petroleum gas